Raul Omar Otero Larzábal (born 15 January 1970 in Montevideo, Uruguay) is a Uruguayan retired footballer who played as a midfielder. He is the older brother of the former striker Marcelo Otero.

International career
Otero made his senior debut for the Uruguay national football team on 19 October 1994 in a friendly match against Peru (0–1 win) in the Estadio Nacional José Díaz in Lima, Peru. His brother Marcelo also earned his first international cap in the same game.

References

External links

1970 births
Living people
Uruguayan footballers
Uruguayan expatriate footballers
Uruguay international footballers
Club Atlético River Plate (Montevideo) players
Hokkaido Consadole Sapporo players
C.A. Cerro players
Danubio F.C. players
Club Olimpia footballers
C.A. Bella Vista players
Uruguay Montevideo players
Expatriate footballers in Paraguay
Expatriate footballers in Japan
Association football midfielders